Wyprawa Robinson, was the only season of the Polish version of Expedition Robinson, or Survivor as it is referred to in some countries and it aired from 7 September 2004 to 13 December 2004. The show adapted many elements from the original Swedish version of the show such as the North and South teams. The main difference in this version from most versions was that tribal council only took place every other episode. Due, to the early exits of Marek Neuman and Magdalena "Magda" Śliwko, who were both evacuated due to injuries they sustained, and Łukasz "Ken" Wiewiórski who quit, two member of the north team were eventually forced to swap teams (Wincenty Ołowski and Witold Casetti). When it came time to merge all of the contestants took part in an elimination challenge which Wincenty lost and was eliminated from the game. When it came time for the final three the contestants competed in a challenge in order to determine who would be the final two. Ultimately, it was Katarzyna "Kasia" Drzyżdżyk who won the season over Patrycja Bokiej by a jury vote of 6-1.

Finishing order

Voting history

 Due to all of the evacuations that took place during episodes 2 and 3, Gosia was not eliminated at the conclusion of the second tribal council.

 As he came second to last at the elimination challenge, Tomek was not permitted to vote at the seventh tribal council.

 As there was a tie at the seventh tribal council, both Agnieszka and Jarek took part in an elimination challenge to determine who would be eliminated.

 As there was a tie at the twelfth tribal council, both Lidka and Tomek took part in an elimination challenge to determine who would be eliminated.

References

External links
 http://wyprawarobinson.onet.pl/

Polish reality television series
Poland
Poland
2004 Polish television series debuts
2004 Polish television series endings
2000s Polish television series